James Thomas Gaffney, Jr.  (April 26, 1921 – August 9, 2015) was an American football quarterback in the National Football League for the Washington Redskins in 1945 and 1946.  He played college football at the University of Tennessee and was drafted in the fifteenth round of the 1944 NFL Draft.

References

1921 births
2015 deaths
American football quarterbacks
United States Army Air Forces pilots of World War II
Players of American football from Maryland
Sportspeople from Cumberland, Maryland
Tennessee Volunteers football players
Washington Redskins players
United States Army Air Forces officers
Wilmington Clippers players